Torolf Nordbø (born 31 December 1956), alias Han Innante, is a Norwegian musician and comedian from Finnøy. The oldest child in a large family, Torolf is best known for his comedy acts on Norwegian radio and TV. Torolf has also toured with several of his revues. He has released five CDs and three DVDs.

In 2005, Torolf received the Rogaland Mållag award for his "Radio Innante".

Discography
This is a discography of Torolf Nordbø's CD albums.
Magalaust (1998)
Sjur, eg trur me snur (vol 2) (2000)
Han Innante i Søren (vol 3) (2002)
Han Innantes juli- og jule-CD (vol 4 1/2) (2005)
Bakpå-lente ting (2007)

Revues on DVD
På bedringens rand (2004)
I to-takt med tiden (2005)

References

External links
Torolf Nordbø's Homepage

1956 births
Living people
Norwegian male comedians